Somatolophia is a genus of moths in the family Geometridae described by George Duryea Hulst in 1896.

Selected species
Somatolophia haydenata (Packard, 1876)
Somatolophia ectrapelaria (Grossbeck, 1908)
Somatolophia pallescens McDunnough, 1940

References
Notes

Bibliography

Geometridae